Eliyahu Rips (born 12 December 1948) is an Israeli mathematician of Latvian origin known for his research in geometric group theory. He became known to the general public following his co-authoring a paper on what is popularly known as Bible code, the supposed coded messaging in the Hebrew text of the Torah.

Biography
Ilya (Eliyahu) Rips grew up in Latvia (then part of the Soviet Union). His mother was Jewish and from Riga, the only of nine siblings that survived the war; the others were killed in Rumbula and other places. His father Aaron was a Jewish mathematician from Belarus; his wife, children, and all of his relatives were killed during the Holocaust.

Rips was the first high school student from Latvia to participate in the International Mathematical Olympiad. In January 1969, he learnt from listening to Western radio broadcast — then illegal in the USSR — of the self-immolation of Czechoslovak student Jan Palach. On 13 April 1969, Rips, then a graduate student at the University of Latvia, attempted self-immolation in a protest against the Soviet invasion of Czechoslovakia. After unwrapping a self-made slogan condemning the occupation of Czechoslovakia he lit a candle and set his gasoline-soaked clothes ablaze. A group of bystanders was able to quickly put the fire out, resulting only in burns to Rips' neck and hands. Though injured, he was first taken to the local KGB office and interrogated.  He was incarcerated by the Soviet government for two years. After his story spread among Western mathematical circles and a wave of petitions, Rips was freed in 1971. The following year, he was allowed to immigrate to Israel.

Rips joined the Department of Mathematics at the Hebrew University of Jerusalem, and in 1975 completed his Ph.D. in mathematics there. His topic was the dimensional subgroup problem. He was awarded the  Aharon Katzir Prize. In 1979, Rips received the Erdős Prize from the Israel Mathematical Society, and was a sectional speaker at the International Congress of Mathematicians in 1994.

Academic career
Rips is a professor in the Department of Mathematics at Hebrew University. His research interests are geometric and combinatorial methods in infinite group theory. This includes small cancellation theory and its generalizations, (Gromov) hyperbolic group theory, Bass-Serre theory and the actions of groups on -trees.

Rips' work on group actions on -trees is mostly unpublished. The Rips machine, in the hands of Rips and his student Zlil Sela, has proven to be effective in obtaining classification results such as a solution to the isomorphism problem for hyperbolic groups.

The Bible Code controversy

In the late 1970s, Rips began looking with the help of a computer for codes in the Torah. In 1994, Rips, together with Doron Witztum and Yoav Rosenberg, published in the journal Statistical Science an article, "Equidistant Letter Sequences in the Book of Genesis", which claimed the discovery of encoded messages in the Hebrew text of the Book of Genesis. This, in turn, was the inspiration for the 1997 book The Bible Code by journalist Michael Drosnin. While Rips originally claimed that he agreed with Drosnin's findings, in 1997 Rips described Drosnin's book as "on very shaky ground" and "of no value." Since Drosnin's book, Bible codes have been a subject of controversy, with the claims being criticized by Brendan McKay and others. An early supporter of Rips' theories was Robert Aumann, Nobel Prize Laureate in Economics 2005, who headed a commission overseeing Rips' experiments attempting to prove the existence of a secret code from God in the Torah. Eventually, Aumann abandoned the idea and withdrew his support from Rips.

The Bible Code treats the text of the Bible as a word search puzzle: for example, a word may be spelled diagonally moving in a north west direction, or perhaps left-to-right taking every second letter. The more patterns that are allowed, the more words that can be found. Elementary statistics can be used to estimate the probabilities of finding certain hidden messages. The statistician Jeffrey S. Rosenthal shows in his book Struck by Lightning: The Curious World of Probabilities that "hidden messages" are statistically expected and hence should not be seen as divine messages, much less as predictions of the future. Mathematician Brendan McKay illustrated this point by finding messages in the English text of Moby Dick that supposedly "predicted" famous assassinations of the past, such as the assassination of John F. Kennedy and the assassination of Indira Gandhi.

The 1997 "Ig Nobel Prize for Literature" was awarded to Eliyahu Rips, Doron Witztum, Yoav Rosenberg, and Michael Drosnin, for their work on Bible codes.

Selected papers

References

External links
 The Bible Code, transcript of a story which aired on BBC Two, Thursday 20 November 2003, featuring comments by Drosnin, Rips, and Brendan McKay.
 Torah Codes: End to Darkness (2015), a documentary in which Rips features prominently. In addition to discussing his text analyses, he relates the story of his self-immolation attempt.
 
 

20th-century Israeli mathematicians
21st-century Israeli mathematicians
20th-century Latvian mathematicians
Bible code
Baalei teshuva
University of Latvia alumni
Latvian Jews
Latvian emigrants to Israel
Scientists from Riga
Soviet dissidents
1948 births
Living people
Academic staff of the Hebrew University of Jerusalem
Group theorists
International Mathematical Olympiad participants
Soviet mathematicians
Soviet emigrants to Israel
Erdős Prize recipients